Manuel da Assumpção (then spelled Manoel da Assumpçam) was a Portuguese missionary who wrote the first grammar of the Bengali language, in 1743, titled "Vocabulario em idioma Bengalla, e Portuguez" (Vocabulary of Bengali language and Portuguese. Divided into two parts) (archaic ).

Grammar and dictionary
The grammar was written in the Portuguese language. Assumpção wrote this first grammatical instructions of the Bengali language between 1734 and 1742 while in Bhawal estate, now in Bangladesh. The book was published in 1743 in Lisbon. The grammar was based on the model of the Latin grammar and used Latin script for writing Bengali words.

Crepar Xastrer Orth, Bhed
Manuel da Assumpção wrote another book under the title “Crepar Xastrer Orth, Bhed” (কৃপার শাস্ত্রের অর্থ-ভেদ). It was a bilingual book Crepar Xastrer Orth, Bhed, / Cathecismo da Doutrina Christãa (Bengali / Portuguese) written in 1735 in Bhawal estate in Bengal, now Bangladesh and published in Lisbon in 1743. It was a missionary book, in format a dialogue between a clergyman and his disciple. The main text was printed on the right page while the translation in Bengali appeared on the left. The whole book was, however, printed in Roman type.

References

External links
 

Bengali language
Portuguese Roman Catholic missionaries
Roman Catholic missionaries in India
Year of death unknown
18th-century Portuguese people
Year of birth unknown
Roman Catholic missionaries in Bangladesh
Portuguese expatriates in India
Missionary linguists